John Kifford (20 October 1875 – 1921) was a Scottish footballer who played in the Football League for Derby County and West Bromwich Albion, and in the Scottish Football League for Abercorn.

References

1875 births
1921 deaths
Date of death missing
Scottish footballers
English Football League players
Scottish Football League players
Association football defenders
Abercorn F.C. players
Derby County F.C. players
Bristol Rovers F.C. players
West Bromwich Albion F.C. players
Millwall F.C. players
Carlisle United F.C. players
Coventry City F.C. players
Footballers from Paisley, Renfrewshire